HD 28185 is a yellow dwarf star similar to the Sun located 128 light-years away from Earth in the constellation Eridanus. The designation HD 28185 refers to its entry in the Henry Draper catalogue. The star is known to possess one long-period extrasolar planet.

Distance and visibility
Since the star is located further than 25 parsecs from Earth, it is not listed in the Gliese Catalogue of Nearby Stars. With an apparent magnitude of 7.81, the star is almost never visible with the naked eye, though it can be seen using binoculars.

Stellar characteristics
HD 28185 is similar to the Sun in terms of mass, radius, and luminosity. The star is on the main sequence and is generating energy by fusing hydrogen in its core. The spectral type of G5V implies HD 28185 is cooler than the Sun. Like the majority of extrasolar planet host stars, HD 28185 is metal-rich relative to the Sun, containing around 173% of the solar abundance of iron. The star rotates slower than the Sun, with a period of around 30 days, compared to 25.4 days for the Sun.

Based on the star's chromospheric activity, HD 28185 is estimated to have an age of around 2,900 million years. On the other hand, evolutionary models give an age of around 7,500 million years and a mass 0.99 times that of the Sun. The higher luminosity and longer rotation period favour an older age for the star.

Planetary system
In 2001 an extrasolar planet similar in size to Jupiter designated HD 28185 b was discovered in orbit around the star with a period of 1.04 years. Unlike many long-period extrasolar planets, it has a low orbital eccentricity. The planet experiences similar insolation to Earth, which has led to speculations about the possibilities for habitable moons. In addition, numerical simulations suggest that low-mass planets located in the gas giant's Trojan points would be stable for long periods. The planet's existence was independently confirmed by the Magellan Planet Search Program in 2008.

The star also shows evidence of a long-term radial velocity trend, which may indicate the presence of an additional outer companion. In 2022, the presence of an outer companion, likely a brown dwarf, was confirmed using a combination of radial velocity and astrometry.

See also
 51 Pegasi
 Iota Horologii

Notes

References

External links

Eridanus (constellation)
G-type main-sequence stars
028185
020723
Planetary systems with one confirmed planet
Durchmusterung objects